A GPS buoy is a buoy equipped with a GPS receiver.
It is used for sea level and research search-and-rescue operations, among other applications.

See also
GPS sonobuoy
Self-locating datum marker buoy

References

Global Positioning System
Buoyage